Iolaus jamesoni is a butterfly in the family Lycaenidae. It is found in the Democratic Republic of the Congo, Uganda, western Kenya and north-western Tanzania. The habitat consists of forests.

The larvae feed on Globimetula braunii.

References

Butterflies described in 1891
Iolaus (butterfly)
Butterflies of Africa